is the eleventh single by Japanese band Princess Princess. Written by Kyōko Tomita, Kanako Nakayama, and Kaori Okui, the single was released by Sony Records on May 10, 1991. It became their fifth and final No. 1 singles on Oricon's singles chart.

Background 
"Kiss" was used by Suntory Foods for their Kōcha no Ki commercials. The song's original key is C.

Chart performance 
"Kiss" hit No. 1 on Oricon's singles chart and No. 26 on Oricon's year-ending chart in 1991. It also sold over 401,000 copies and was certified Platinum by the RIAJ.

Track listing 
All music is arranged by Princess Princess.

Chart positions 
Weekly chartsYear-end charts

Certifications

References

External links 
 
 
 

Songs about kissing
1991 singles
1991 songs
Princess Princess (band) songs
Japanese-language songs
Oricon Weekly number-one singles
Sony Music Entertainment Japan singles
Songs written by Kaori Kishitani